Klaidi Cela (born July 16, 1999) is a Canadian professional soccer player.

Club career

Early career 
Cela began his career at the age of eight when playing for Mississauga Falcons SC. In October 2012, he joined the Toronto FC Academy.

Toronto FC II 
On May 1, 2015, Cela signed with Toronto FC II, alongside Gabriel Boakye, Malik Johnson and Brogan Engbers. He made a single appearance for the affiliate club during the 2015 USL season. Cela made his professional debut on the final day of the season, playing for 29 minutes in a 2–0 defeat to Rochester Rhinos. He also appeared for Toronto FC III in both League1 Ontario and the Premier Development League.

Gafanha 
In summer 2016, Cela signed with Campeonato de Portugal club Gafanha, where he would play for two seasons.

Sigma FC 
After leaving Gafanha, Cela returned to Canada and spent the remainder of the 2018 season with Sigma FC in League1 Ontario, making one league appearance and another three appearances in the playoffs.

Forge FC 
On April 3, 2019, Cela signed with Canadian Premier League side Forge FC.

Sigma FC and Forge FC return
In 2021, he returned to Sigma FC of League1 Ontario. In August 2021, it was announced that Forge had re-signed Cela on a short term deal. Cela rejoined Forge for a single game in September, and was eventually signed in October by Forge for the remainder of the 2021 Canadian Premier League season.

Toronto FC II 
On March 31, 2022, Cela signed with MLS Next Pro side Toronto FC II.

International career 
Due to Cela's parents being born in Albania, he is eligible to represent both Canada and Albania. Cela was chosen to be included in the Canada Under-15 camps in Vaughan and Costa Rica, as well as an Under-18 development camp. However, he is yet to make an international appearance for either nation.

References

External links 

1999 births
Living people
Association football defenders
Canadian soccer players
Soccer players from Mississauga
Canadian people of Albanian descent
Canadian expatriate soccer players
Expatriate footballers in Portugal
Canadian expatriate sportspeople in Portugal
Toronto FC II players
Forge FC players
USL Championship players
Campeonato de Portugal (league) players
League1 Ontario players
Canadian Premier League players
G.D. Gafanha players
Sigma FC players
Toronto FC players
MLS Next Pro players